Phyllonorycter nigristella is a moth of the family Gracillariidae. It is found on the islands of Hokkaidō, Honshū and Shikoku in Japan and in the Russian Far East.

The larvae feed on Quercus dentata, Quercus mongolica and Quercus serrata. They mine the leaves of their host plant. The mine has the form of a large, tentiform mine, between two veins on the underside of the leaf.

References

nigristella
Moths of Japan
Moths of Asia
Moths described in 1957